The following is a list of notable events and releases of the year 1915 in Norwegian music.

Events

Deaths

Births

 January
 9 – Olga Marie Mikalsen, singer (died 2006).
 23 – Aage Samuelsen, evangelist, singer, and composer (died 1987).

 February
 3 – Henki Kolstad, singer and actor (died 2008)

 May
 8 – Arvid Fladmoe, composer and conductor (died 1993).

 September
 3 – Knut Nystedt, orchestral and choral composer (died 2014).
 23 – Finn Arnestad, contemporary composer and musician (died 1994).

 November 
 2 – Sverre Bergh, composer, pianist, and orchestra conductor (died 1980).
 14 – Jens Book Jenssen, singer, songwriter, revue artist, and theatre director (died 1998).

See also
 1915 in Norway
 Music of Norway

References

 
Norwegian music
Norwegian
Music
1910s in Norwegian music